Louise Young may refer to:

Louise Young (historian), historian of modern Japanese history
Louise Nichols Young (1862–1951), first female admitted to practice law in the state of Idaho
Louise Young, former owner of The Grove
Louise Young, a character on Misfits
Louise Young, astronomer who colleagued with James Whitney Young in 1969 on hypersensitization
Louise Young (camogie), camogie player for Tipperary, see All-Ireland Senior Camogie Championship 2006
N. Louise Young (1907–1997), first African-American woman physician in the state of Maryland